Gwandara is a West Chadic language, and the closest relative of Hausa. Its several dialects are spoken in northern Nigeria, predominantly in the north central region of Nigeria by the Gwandara people and some settlers who are about 30,000 people. They are found in large numbers in Abuja, Niger, Kaduna, Kogi and a resettlement town of New Karshi, Karu LGA, Nasarawa State. New Karshi has a Gwandara first class emir Muhammadu Bako III (PhD). 

The Gwandara people are one of the indigenous tribes of FCT Abuja, the capital city of Nigeria.

The Nimbia dialect has a duodecimal numeral system (they count in base 12), whereas other dialects, such as Karshi below, have decimal systems:

It is thought that Nimbia, which is isolated from the rest of Gwandara, acquired its duodecimal system from neighboring East Kainji languages. It is duodecimal even to powers of base twelve: 
The Nimbia 12 number set number system is known for making division easier.

References

Language
West Chadic languages
Languages of Nigeria